The 2005 Major League Baseball All-Star Game was the 76th playing of the midseason exhibition baseball game between the all-stars of the American League (AL) and National League (NL), the two leagues comprising Major League Baseball. The game was held on July 12, 2005 at Comerica Park in Detroit, Michigan, the home of the Detroit Tigers of the American League. The game resulted in the American League defeating the National League 7–5, thus awarding an AL team (which eventually came to be the Chicago White Sox) home-field advantage in the 2005 World Series. In this game Rawlings first previewed the Coolflo batting helmets.

Rosters
Players in italics have since been inducted into the National Baseball Hall of Fame.

National League

American League

Notes
 Player declined or was unable to play.
 Player replaced vacant spot on roster.
 Player was voted onto roster via the All-Star Final Vote.

Managers
National League: Tony LaRussa
American League: Terry Francona

Game

Umpires

Starting lineups

Game summary

A superchoir consisting of three choirs from Windsor, Ontario, sang "O Canada", the Canadian National Anthem. Then, a moment of silence for the victims of the July 7 London bombings, which took place a few days before the game, followed by the Detroit Symphony Orchestra Brass Players' performance of "God Save the Queen", the national anthem of the United Kingdom. Brian McKnight sang The Star-Spangled Banner, the U.S. National Anthem.  The colors presentation was by the Camp Grayling color guard, accompanied by University of Toledo ROTC officers who presented the flags in the outfield.

In the first inning, starters Mark Buehrle and Chris Carpenter each induced a double play, from Carlos Beltrán and Manny Ramírez respectively, to end early threats. The American League would score in the bottom of the second, when the game's MVP, Miguel Tejada, crushed a shot off John Smoltz to give the AL a 1–0 lead. The AL would score two more in the third, on the strength of a David Ortiz RBI single, and an RBI groundout by Tejada, his second RBI in as many innings.

The NL wasted a scoring opportunity in the top of the fourth, when with two runners on, Aramis Ramírez grounded into a double play to end that threat. In the bottom of that inning, Ichiro Suzuki hit a broken-bat, bloop single to score two, but was then picked off first base by Liván Hernández. Then, in the bottom of the sixth, Mark Teixeira, a switch-hitter, hit an opposite field, two-run homer off Dontrelle Willis, his first home run off a left-hander that season, opening the AL's lead to 7–0.

During the seventh-inning stretch, Brian McKnight sang God Bless America.

The NL finally got on the board in the next inning, when Andruw Jones launched a two-run shot just inside the foul pole off Kenny Rogers to close the NL to within five. They scored another run in the eighth, when Moisés Alou scored on an RBI forceout by Miguel Cabrera.

In the top of the ninth, Luis Gonzalez scored Andruw Jones with a double off of Baltimore closer B.J. Ryan, and then scored himself on an RBI groundout by Carlos Lee. Mariano Rivera then came on to stop the NL's potential rally. Rivera struck out Morgan Ensberg to end the threat, and the game, securing a 7–5 win for the AL.

Hall-of-Famer and former Tigers outfielder Al Kaline joined the ceremonial first pitch ceremonies.

Home Run Derby
In this event, the eight competitors each came from a different nation.  This format dovetailed with the announcement of the launch of the World Baseball Classic the week before, as of the following year.

Footnotes and references

External links
All-Star Game Home Page
Home Run Derby
July 12, 2005 All-Star Game at Comerica Park Box Score and Play by Play - Baseball-Reference.com

Major League Baseball All-Star Game
Major League Baseball All-Star Game
Baseball competitions in Detroit
Major League Baseball All Star Game
2005 in sports in Michigan
July 2005 sports events in the United States